Marked Men is a 1919 American silent Western film directed by John Ford and starring Harry Carey. Considered to be lost, it is a remake of the 1916 film The Three Godfathers, which also starred Carey.

Cast
 Harry Carey as Cheyenne Harry
 Joe Harris as Tom Gibbons
 Ted Brooks as Tony Garcia
 Charles Le Moyne as Sheriff Pete Cushing
 J. Farrell MacDonald as Tom Placer McGraw
 Winifred Westover as Ruby Merrill
 David Kirby as Warden Bruiser Kelly (uncredited)

See also
 Harry Carey filmography
 List of lost films

References

External links

 
 

1919 films
1919 Western (genre) films
1919 lost films
American black-and-white films
Remakes of American films
Films based on American novels
Films based on Western (genre) novels
Films directed by John Ford
Lost Western (genre) films
Lost American films
Silent American Western (genre) films
Universal Pictures films
1910s American films